Pedubastis or Petubastis, are Hellenized forms of the ancient Egyptian personal theophoric name Padibastet (alternatively Padibast or  Pedubast) (P3-dj-Bstt), meaning "Given by Bastet". Notable bearers were:
Pedubast I (r. 9th century BCE), a pharaoh of the 23rd Dynasty
Pedubast II (r. 8th or 7th century BCE), a ruler of Tanis
Pedubast III (r. 522 – 520 BCE), a rebel pharaoh during the 27th Dynasty
Pedubast, a high steward during the 26th Dynasty

In addition, various kinglets of the Third Intermediate Period of Egypt bore the name Pedubastis.

References

Ancient Egyptian given names
Theophoric names
Bastet